Mission: Impossible – Ghost Protocol is a 2011 American action spy film directed by Brad Bird (in his live-action debut) and produced by and starring Tom Cruise from a screenplay by Josh Appelbaum and André Nemec. It is the sequel to Mission: Impossible III (2006) and is the fourth installment in the Mission: Impossible film series. It also stars Jeremy Renner, Simon Pegg, and Paula Patton. In the film, the Impossible Missions Force (IMF) are shut down after being publicly implicated in a bombing of the Kremlin, causing Ethan Hunt (Cruise) and his team to go without resources or backup in the life-threatening effort to clear their names.

Development for Mission: Impossible – Ghost Protocol began in August 2009, when Appelbaum and Nemec were hired to write the screenplay (which contained uncredited rewrites by eventual series director and writer Christopher McQuarrie). Cruise's return was confirmed by March 2010 after Bird was announced to replace J. J. Abrams, who directed the predecessor. The film was officially titled in October 2010, after which, principal photography took place and lasted until March 2011, with filming locations including Mumbai, Budapest, Moscow, Dubai, and Canadian Motion Picture Park Studios in Vancouver. Like previous entries in the franchise, the cast completed most of their own stunts, while parts of the film was shot in IMAX.

Mission: Impossible – Ghost Protocol premiered in Dubai on December 7, 2011 and was released in IMAX and select large-format theaters on December 16, before being theatrically released in the United States by Paramount Pictures on December 21. It received highly positive reviews from critics, with praise for the action sequences, Cruise's performance, and Bird's direction. It grossed $694 million worldwide, becoming the fifth-highest-grossing film of 2011 as well as the highest grossing film in the franchise and the highest grossing film starring Cruise until the release of Mission: Impossible – Fallout in 2018. The next film in the series, Mission: Impossible – Rogue Nation, was released in 2015.

Plot
 
IMF agent Trevor Hanaway is killed in Budapest by assassin Sabine Moreau, who steals Russian nuclear launch codes to sell to a man named "Cobalt". IMF agent Ethan Hunt is extracted from a Moscow prison, along with an asset named Bogdan, by Hanaway's handler and girlfriend Jane Carter and newly-promoted field agent Benji Dunn. The team is ordered to infiltrate the Kremlin for information on Cobalt. While they are inside, Cobalt blows the team's cover and they escape before a bomb destroys much of the Kremlin. Jane and Benji escape, but Ethan is arrested by SVR agent Anatoly Sidorov and is blamed for the bombing.

Ethan escapes and meets with the IMF Secretary, who is in Moscow with analyst William Brandt. Brandt identifies Cobalt as Kurt Hendricks, a strategist seeking nuclear war between the U.S. and Russia. They determine that Hendricks bombed the Kremlin to cover his theft of a Russian launch control device. The Secretary explains that the President has initiated "Ghost Protocol", disavowing the entire IMF. He instead orders Ethan to continue pursuing Cobalt before they are suddenly attacked by Sidorov's forces and the Secretary is killed. Ethan escapes with Brandt and regroups with Jane and Benji. They plan to infiltrate a meeting between Hendricks' associate, Wistrom, and Moreau at the Burj Khalifa in Dubai where Wistrom will buy the stolen launch codes. Wistrom is accompanied by Leonid Lisenker, a Polish cryptographer who is blackmailed by Hendricks to authenticate the codes. 

The IMF team plans to intercept the codes by faking two meetings: Ethan and Brandt posing as Wistrom and Lisenker to receive the codes from the real Moreau while, one floor away, Jane poses as Moreau, passing counterfeit ones to the real Wistrom and Lisenker. However, because of Lisenker's ability to identify fakes, they are forced to give the real codes, relying on radioactive isotopes on the paper to track Wistrom afterwards. Completing the buy, Wistrom murders Lisenker while Moreau, having deduced that the buy is a setup, attempts to escape, but inadvertently gets into a fight with Jane, who kicks her out a window to her death. Sidorov nearly apprehends Ethan, whom he knocks down.

Ethan pursues Wistrom, who unmasks himself as Hendricks and escapes, while Jane and Benji confront Brandt over his unusual fighting skills in the hotel. Brandt admits that he resigned as a field agent after failing to protect Julia Meade, Ethan's wife, from a hit. Ethan is taken by Bogdan to the Fog, an arms dealer, and learns that Hendricks is buying an obsolete Soviet military satellite from Indian media tycoon Brij Nath. The Fog later gives the same information to Sidorov, in return for clearing his rap sheet. In Mumbai, Jane seduces Nath into his bedroom chambers wearing a flirtatious dress, then overpowers him to get the satellite's override code; the team now pursues Hendricks and Wistrom to one of Nath's broadcast stations to stop him from sending the codes via the satellite. 

Hendricks sends launch orders to a Russian nuclear submarine to fire a missile at San Francisco and Wistrom sabotages the system. Jane, Brandt, and Benji fight and kill Wistrom and work to repair the station while Ethan pursues Hendricks. Cornered, Hendricks jumps to his death in order to place the launch device out of reach. The team gets the systems online and Ethan successfully retrieves the launch device and disables the missile moments before detonation. Sidorov and his men arrive, only to realise that Ethan was giving him clues to track them and that the IMF was innocent of the Kremlin bombing, and offers Ethan a ride to the hospital.

In Seattle, Ethan assembles his team for another mission given by Luther Stickell. Brandt confesses his failure to protect Julia, but Ethan reveals that she is alive and her death was staged to give her a new identity safely away from him, and to let him infiltrate the prison to find Bogdan. A relieved Brandt accepts his mission and agrees to become an agent again. Julia arrives at the harbour and spots Ethan watching her from a distance, as they share a warm smile. As he leaves Ethan receives a debrief about a breach in the IMF's military communications network by an emerging terrorist network known as The Syndicate, disappearing into the fog as he listens to it.

Cast

 Tom Cruise as Ethan Hunt, an agent of the Impossible Missions Force (IMF) and protagonist of the film
 Jeremy Renner as William Brandt, the IMF Secretary's aide and an intelligence analyst
 Simon Pegg as Benji Dunn, a new IMF field agent and former IMF technician
 Paula Patton as Jane Carter, an IMF agent and Hanaway's handler who works with Ethan
 Michael Nyqvist as Kurt Hendricks, a Swedish-born Russian nuclear strategist codenamed 'Cobalt'
 Vladimir Mashkov as Anatoly Sidorov, a Russian SVR Agent who is after Ethan
 Léa Seydoux as Sabine Moreau, an assassin who worked for Hendricks at Dubai
 Josh Holloway as Trevor Hanaway, an IMF agent murdered by Moreau
 Anil Kapoor as Brij Nath, a media tycoon at Mumbai
 Samuli Edelmann as Marius Wistrom, Hendrick's henchman
 Ivan Shvedoff as Leonid Lisenker, a cryptography expert coerced by Hendricks
 Miraj Grbić as Bogdan, an informant in a Moscow prison
 Ilia Volok as The Fog, an arms dealer and Bogdan's cousin
 Andreas Wisniewski as The Fog's contact
 Tom Wilkinson (uncredited) as the IMF Secretary
 Ving Rhames (uncredited cameo) as Luther Stickell
 Michelle Monaghan (uncredited cameo) as Julia Meade-Hunt, Ethan's wife

Production
Despite Mission: Impossible III (2006) earning less than its predecessors at the box office, its critical reception was much better than its predecessors and Paramount Pictures was keen on developing a fourth in the series. In August 2009, Josh Appelbaum and André Nemec were hired to write the film's screenplay. Because of other commitments, J. J. Abrams said that it was unlikely for him to return as director but made note that he will produce the film alongside Tom Cruise. By March 2010, director Brad Bird was in talks of directing the film with Cruise returning to star as Ethan Hunt.

The film was originally announced with a working name of Mission: Impossible 4 and code-named "Aries" during early production. By August 2010, title considerations did not include the Mission: Impossible 4 name, and thought was given to omitting the specific term "Mission: Impossible", which Variety compared to Christopher Nolan's Batman sequel film The Dark Knight. In late October 2010, the title was confirmed as Mission: Impossible – Ghost Protocol.

Christopher McQuarrie, who later directed Mission: Impossible – Rogue Nation (2015) and Mission: Impossible – Fallout (2018), did an uncredited rewrite of the screenplay, explaining that:

Filming
The film was partially shot with IMAX cameras, which made up approximately 30 minutes of the film's run time. Bird insisted that certain scenes of the film be shot in IMAX, as opposed to 3D, as he felt that the IMAX format offered the viewer more immersion due to its brighter, higher quality image, which is projected on a larger screen, without the need for specialised glasses. Bird also believed that the IMAX format would bring back "a level of showmanship" to the presentation of Hollywood films, which he believes the industry has lost due to its emphasis on screening films in multiplexes as opposed to grand theaters, and vetoing "first runs" in favor of wider initial releases.

Principal photography took place from October 2010 to March 19, 2011. Filming took place in Budapest, Mumbai, Prague, Moscow, Vancouver, Bangalore, Chennai, and Dubai. Although Cruise appears to be free solo climbing in the film with the help of special gloves, in reality, he was securely attached to the Burj Khalifa at all times by multiple cables. Industrial Light & Magic digitally erased the cables in post-production. Following Cruise's example, Patton and Seydoux also chose to forgo the use of stunt doubles for their fight scene at the Burj Khalifa where Carter exacts her revenge upon Moreau for Hanaway's death.

Many of the film's interior scenes were shot at Vancouver's Canadian Motion Picture Park Studios, including a key transition scene in a specially equipped IMF train car and the fight between Hunt and Hendricks in a Mumbai automated multi-level parking garage (which was constructed over a six-month period just for the film). The Vancouver Convention Centre was modified to double as downtown Bangalore. The film's opening Moscow prison escape scenes were shot on location in a real former prison near Prague.

Bird, having directed several Disney and Pixar films and short films, incorporated the trademark "A113" into the film on two separate occasions. The first is the design print on Hanaway's ring during the flashback sequence, and the second being when Hunt calls in for support and uses the drop callsign, Alpha 1–1–3.

Music

The musical score for Mission: Impossible – Ghost Protocol was composed by Michael Giacchino, who also composed the music for the third film and collaborated with Bird on The Incredibles (2004) and Ratatouille (2007). As in previous installments, the score incorporates Lalo Schifrin's themes from the original television series. "Lalo is an amazing jazz writer. You know you can't write a straight-up jazz score for a film like this but you can certainly hint at it here and there," said Giacchino, explaining the stylistic influence generated by Schifrin's history with the franchise. A soundtrack album was released by Varèse Sarabande on December 13, 2011.

Marketing
In July 2011, a teaser trailer for Ghost Protocol was released illustrating new shots from the film, one of which being Tom Cruise scaling the world's tallest building, the Burj Khalifa in Dubai. Moreover, prior to its release, the studio presented IMAX footage of the film to an invitation-only crowd of opinion makers and journalists at central London's BFI IMAX theater. One of the many scenes that were included was a chase scene in a Dubai desert sandstorm.

During November 2011, the Paramount released a Facebook game of the film in order to promote it. The new game allowed players to choose the roles of IMF agents and assemble teams to embark on a multiplayer journey. Players were also able to garner tickets to the film's U.S. premiere and a hometown screening of the film for 30 friends.

Release

Theatrical
Following the world premiere in Dubai on December 7, 2011, the film was released in IMAX and other large-format theaters in the U.S. on December 16, 2011, with general release on December 21, 2011. This is the first film to use the current Paramount Pictures logo, with the a brand new fanfare composed by Michael Giacchino, who also composed the film, as part of the studio's 100th anniversary in 2012.

Home media
Mission: Impossible – Ghost Protocol was released on DVD, Blu-ray, and digital download on April 17, 2012. The home media releases, however, do not preserve the original IMAX imagery, and its aspect ratio is consistently cropped to 2.40:1 rather than switching to a 1.78:1 aspect ratio during the IMAX scenes. Prior Blu-ray Disc releases such as The Dark Knight, Tron: Legacy, and Transformers: Revenge of the Fallen have switched between 2.40:1 for regular scenes and 1.78:1 for IMAX scenes. The film was released on 4K UHD Blu-ray on June 26, 2018.

Reception

Box office
Ghost Protocol grossed $209.4 million in North America and $485.3 million in other countries for a worldwide total of $694.7 million. It is the second-highest-grossing film worldwide in the Mission: Impossible series, and the fifth-highest-grossing film of 2011. It is also the third-highest-grossing film worldwide starring Cruise, surpassing War of the Worlds from the top spot. It was the franchise's highest-grossing film and Cruise's biggest film at the time of release, before being surpassed by Mission: Impossible – Fallout seven years later.

In limited release at 425 locations in North America, it earned $12.8 million over its opening weekend. After five days of limited release, it expanded to 3,448 theaters on its sixth day and reached #1 at the box office with $8.92 million. The film reached the top stop at the box office in its second and third weekends with $29.6 million and $29.4 million, respectively. Though only 9% of the film's screenings were in IMAX theaters, they accounted for 23% of the film's box office.

Outside North America, it debuted to a $69.5 million in 42 markets representing approximately 70% of the marketplace. In the United Arab Emirates, it set an opening-weekend record of $2.4 million (since surpassed by Marvel's The Avengers). In two countries outside the U.S. in which filming took place, its opening weekend gross increased by multiples over the previous installment: in Russia, more than doubling, to $6.08 million and in India, more than quadrupling, to $4.0 million. It is the second-highest-grossing Mission: Impossible film outside North America. It topped the box office outside North America for three consecutive weekends (during December 2011) and five weekends in total (the other two in 2012). Its highest-grossing markets after North America are China ($102.5 million), Japan ($69.7 million), and South Korea ($51.1 million).

Critical response
On Rotten Tomatoes, Mission: Impossible – Ghost Protocol has an approval rating of 93% based on 239 reviews and an average rating of 7.70/10. The critical consensus on Rotten Tomatoes reads: "Stylish, fast-paced, and loaded with gripping set pieces, the fourth Mission: Impossible is big-budget popcorn entertainment that really works." Metacritic assigned the film a score of 73 out of 100 based on 47 critics, indicating "generally favorable reviews." Audiences polled by CinemaScore gave the film an average grade of "A−" on an A+ to F scale.

Roger Ebert of the Chicago Sun-Times gave the film 3.5 out of four stars, saying the film "is a terrific thriller with action sequences that function as a kind of action poetry." Stephen Whitty of The Star-Ledger wrote "The eye-candy—from high-tech gadgets to gorgeous people—has only been ratcheted up. And so has the excitement." He also gave the film 3.5 out of four stars. Giving the film three out of four stars, Wesley Morris of The Boston Globe said "In its way, the movie has old-Hollywood elegance. The scope and sets are vast, tall, and cavernous, but Bird scales down for spatial intimacy."

Philippa Hawker of The Sydney Morning Herald gave the film three stars out of five and said it is "ludicrously improbable, but also quite fun." Owen Gleiberman of Entertainment Weekly opined that the movie "brims with scenes that are exciting and amazing at the same time; they're brought off with such casual aplomb that they're funny, too. ... Ghost Protocol is fast and explosive, but it's also a supremely clever sleight-of-hand thriller. Brad Bird, the animation wizard, ... showing an animator's miraculously precise use of visual space, has a playful, screw-tightening ingenuity all his own." Roger Moore of The Charlotte Observer gave the film three out of four stars; said "Brad Bird passes his audition for a career as a live-action director. And Ghost Protocol more than makes its bones as an argument for why Tom Cruise should continue in this role as long as his knees, and his nerves, hold up."

IndieWire ranked it as one of the best action movies of the 21st century.

Accolades

Sequel

In December 2011, Pegg suggested that he and Cruise were interested in returning for a fifth Mission: Impossible film. Paramount was also reportedly interested in fast-tracking a fifth film due to the fourth film's success. Bird had stated that he probably would not return to direct a fifth film, but Tom Cruise had been confirmed to return. It was revealed in August 2013 that Christopher McQuarrie would be the director of Mission: Impossible 5. Principal photography began in February 2014 in London. Paramount Pictures released the film on July 31, 2015. The plot centers around Hunt's IMF team in conflict with "the Syndicate", an international criminal organization first mentioned at the end of Ghost Protocol.

References

External links

 
 
 
 
 
 
 

Mission: Impossible (film series)
Moscow Kremlin in fiction
2011 films
2011 action thriller films
2010s spy action films
American action thriller films
Films shot in India
American sequel films
American spy action films
2010s English-language films
Films scored by Michael Giacchino
Films about nuclear war and weapons
Films about terrorism in Europe
Films based on television series
Films directed by Brad Bird
Films produced by J. J. Abrams
Films set in Budapest
Films set in Dubai
Films set in Mumbai
Films set in Moscow
Films set in the San Francisco Bay Area
Films set in San Francisco
Films set in Seattle
Films shot in Budapest
Films shot in Dubai
Films shot in Moscow
Films shot in San Francisco
Films shot in the Czech Republic
Films shot in the United Arab Emirates
Films shot in Vancouver
IMAX films
Films with screenplays by Josh Appelbaum and André Nemec
Bad Robot Productions films
Skydance Media films
Paramount Pictures films
Films produced by Tom Cruise
Films shot in Mumbai
Films shot in Bangalore
2010s American films